Leoluca, also Leone Luca, Leo Luke of Corleone, Saint Leoluca, or Luke of Sicily (c. 815 – c. 915) was the abbot and wonderworker of the monastery of Mount Mula in Calabria, and a founder of Italo-Greek monasticism in southern Italy. He is venerated as a saint in the Roman Catholic and Eastern Orthodox churches.

Born in the Sicilian town of Corleone, he died about a hundred years later, after eighty years of monastic life, in Monteleone Calabro, now Vibo Valentia in Calabria. Today he is a patron saint of both towns, and his feast day is celebrated on 1 March.

In 2006 Leoluca's relics were found in the municipality of San Gregorio d'Ippona, about 2 km southeast of the city of Vibo Valentia.

Hagiographic sources

The text of the Life of Leo Luke of Corleone was published in 1657 in the Sicilian martyrology of Jesuit Ottavio Gaetani ("Vitae Sanctorum Siculorum"). He was said to have derived it from three manuscripts discovered in Sicily: one from Palermo, another from Mazara and a third from Corleone.

Later, the Bollandists published another Life, in Latin, found in the library of Joseph Acosta.

None of the Latin manuscripts of the hagiography of Leo Luke refer to an original Greek source. However the presence of Greek anthroponyms (such as Leone, Teotiste, Christopher, Teodoro, Eutimio) may postulate an original source in Greek. The hagiography was likely composed immediately after the death of Leoluca in Calabria, but may have been passed down orally and then in writing at a later date and in another place.

Life

In Sicily

Leoluca was born in Corleone, Sicily in the 9th century AD (c.815 to 818 AD), on the eve of the Saracen invasion of Sicily. His parents Leo and Theoktiste baptized him Leo, in honour of his father. They were a pious and wealthy family who raised him in the nurture and admonition of the Lord. He was orphaned at an early age when his parents died, and devoted himself to managing the estate and supervising the herds as a shepherd. In the solitude of the fields he realized that he had a call to religious life, so he sold the estate, gave the money to the poor, and went to the monastery of St. Philip in Agira, in the province of Enna, Sicily.

It is not known how long he stayed at the monastery at Agira, but due to the raids of the Saracens, he left from there and went to Calabria. Before going to Calabria however, he made a special point of going on pilgrimage to visit the tombs of Saint Peter and Paul the Apostle in Rome.

In Calabria

In Calabria, he went to the Monastery of Mula, at Mount Mula (Monte La Mula ), one of the highest peaks of the Orsomarso mountains (1935 m). Here he became a monk, excelling in the virtues and in obedience, remaining there for six years.

Afterwards he departed together with the Hegumen of the monastery Christopher, and they made their way to the mountainous region of Merkourion in northern Calabria, in the Pollino area of the Southern Apennines, an important center of monastic settlement which is referred to in several of the Vitae as the "New Thebaid". Here they founded a new monastery, living there in asceticism for another seven years.

Once more they left and moved on to Vena (modern Avena, Calabria) to continue the spiritual struggle for another ten years. Here they built another monastery, which by the time of Hegumen Christopher's death had more than one-hundred monks in it. Leoluca himself lived the solitary life nearby at Mormanno, Calabria.

A little later, after the death of Abbot Christopher, Leoluca became abbot of the monastery of Mount Mula. According to tradition, God granted to him the gift of Wonderworking, and many faithful flocked to him to receive his blessing and be healed. The Venerable Luke was thought to have healed the sick, exorcized demons, raised paralytics, and guided the lost towards the path of salvation. He prayed without ceasing, and remained out in the cold up to twenty days, in order to intensify his ascetic struggle.

Departure

It is said that he lived the last days of his life in meditation, fasting and ecstatic raptures. In old age, he called the monks to come to him, and foretold his end. He delegated the responsibility of the position of Hegumen to the monk Theodore, and assigned the priest Euthymios as his assistant. Having received Holy Communion, the Venerable Luke fell asleep in peace and was buried in the church of the Blessed Theotokos.

Veneration

News of Leoluca's death spread slowly to Corleone, and it is only in the 13th century that there is evidence of a church dedicated to him in his birthplace. In 1420 there are also references to a Brotherhood of San Leoluca.

Leoluca's intercession is credited with saving the city of Corleone during an outbreak of the plague of 1575, and he was made the patron saint of that town. In 1624 he was made the patron saint of Vibo Valentia as well.

In addition, the apparition of Saint Leo Luke and Saint Anthony is credited with preventing a Bourbon invasion of Corleone on 27 May 1860.
 
In Vibo Valentia in Calabria, during his feast day on 1 March, the local fire brigade pay him homage by placing a crown of flowers at the feet of his statue which is located high on the façade of the Cathedral Church of Santa Maria Maggiore e San Leoluca, using a turntable ladder to perform the act.

Relics
Some historians assert that Leoluca was buried in Monteleone Calabro, now Vibo Valentia, in Calabria, in the church of Santa Maria Maggiore. (i.e. Cathedral Church of Santa Maria Maggiore e San Leoluca).

However, on Sunday 10 December 2006 the Italian daily newspaper La Sicilia, based in Catania, Sicily, ran a full page story stating that the relics of Leoluca had been found in the municipality of San Gregorio d'Ippona, about 2 km southeast of the city of Vibo Valentia. It stated that they were located in the grotto of the Church of Santa Ruba (La Chiesa di Santa Ruba), and that they were confirmed by paleontological analysis. According to professor Gregorio Vaianella, the church of Santa Ruba was dedicated to 'Our Lady of Health' (Madonna della Sanità).

See also

 Byzantine monasticism
 Byzantine Rite
 Basilian monk

Notes

References

Sources
 March 1. Latin Saints of the Orthodox Patriarchate of Rome.
 Lynn White Jr. "The Byzantinization of Sicily." The American Historical Review. Vol. 42, No. 1 (Oct., 1936). p. 5.
 Rosemary Morris. Monks and Laymen in Byzantium, 843-1118. Cambridge University Press, 2003. 356pp.
 Robert E. Sinkewicz. "Italo-Greek". In: Richard Barrie Dobson. Encyclopedia of the Middle Ages, Volume 2 (K-Z). Eds.: André Vauchez, Michael Lapidge. Transl: Adrian Walford. Routledge, 2000. p. 974.
 Ann Wharton Epstein. "The Problem of Provincialism: Byzantine Monasteries in Cappadocia and Monks in South Italy." Journal of the Warburg and Courtauld Institutes. Vol. 42 (1979), pp. 28–46.
 Saint Leolucas of Corleone. Saints.SPQN.com. 25 February 2010.
 Luke of Sicily. OrthodoxWiki.

In Greek
 Great Synaxaristes: Ὁ Ὅσιος Λουκᾶς ὁ ἐκ Σικελίας. 1 Μαρτίου. ΜΕΓΑΣ ΣΥΝΑΞΑΡΙΣΤΗΣ.

In Latin
 Ottavio Gaetani. Vitae Sanctorum Siculorum ex antiquis Graecis Latinisque monumentis. Tomus Secundus. Gesuiti : Preposto generale, Gesuiti : Collegio Romano. 1657. pp. 80–84.
 "TESTIMONIUM CORILIONENSIUM DE CULTU ET ACTIS ANTIQUIS. (S. Leo Lucas Corilionensis, Abbas Mulensis in Calabria)." In: ACTA SANCTORUM, MARTII TOMUS PRIMUS. PARISIIS ET ROMÆ APUD VICTOREM PALMÉ, BIBLIOPOLAM. 1865. pp. 98–102.

In Italian
 Professor Maria Stelladoro. Leone Luca di Corleone (sec. IX-X) BHL 4842. ITALIA MEDIEVALE (Associazione Culturale Italia Medievale). 11 Aprile 2003.
 San Leone Luca (Leoluca) di Corleone. SANTI, BEATI E TESTIMONI. 
 San Leoluca. Italian Wikipedia.
 SAN LEOLUCA. Enrosadira.
 Giorgio Leone. I BENI CULTURALI DEL VIBONESE. SITUAZIONE ATTUALE – PROSPETTIVE FUTURE. 27 – 28 – 29 DICEMBRE 1995.
 Trovate le spoglie di San Leoluca. LA SICILIA. DOMENICA 10 DICEMBRE 2006.
 Santa Ruba. San Gregorio D'ippona.

810s births
910s deaths
9th-century Byzantine monks
10th-century Byzantine monks
10th-century Christian saints
Basilian saints
Byzantine abbots
Byzantine saints of the Eastern Orthodox Church
Christian hagiography
Italian abbots
Italian centenarians
Medieval Italian saints
People from Corleone
People from the Province of Vibo Valentia
Religious leaders from the Province of Palermo
Sicilian Christian monks
Sicilian saints
Miracle workers
Men centenarians